A popular front is "any coalition of working-class and middle-class parties", including  liberal and social democratic ones, "united for the defense of democratic forms" against "a presumed Fascist assault". 
More generally, it is "a coalition especially of leftist political parties against a common opponent".

The term was first used in the mid-1930s in Europe by communists concerned over the ascent of the ideology of Fascism in Italy and Germany which they sought to combat by coalescing with non-communist political groupings they had previously attacked as enemies. Temporarily successful popular front governments were formed in France, Spain, and Chile in 1936.

Not all political organizations who use the term "popular front" are leftist or coalitions formed to defend democratic norms (for example Popular Front of India), and not all leftist or anti-fascist coalitions use the term "popular front" in their name.

Terminology and similar groups
When communist parties came to power after World War II in the  People's Republic of China, and the countries of Central, and Eastern Europe, it was common to do so at the head of a "front" (such as the  United Front and Chinese People's Political Consultative Conference in China, the National Front in Czechoslovakia, the Front of National Unity in Poland, the Democratic Bloc in the German Democratic Republic, etc.) containing several ostensibly-noncommunist parties. While it was the communist party—not the fronts—that held power in these countries, the alleged coalitions gave the Party the ability to maintain that it did not have a monopoly on power in that country.
 
Another use of the word "front" in connection with communist activity was "Communist front".  This phrase used "front" not in the sense of a political movement "linking divergent elements to achieve common objectives", but as a facade "used to mask" the identity/true character/activity of "the actual controlling agent", (examples being the World Federation of Democratic Youth, International Union of Students, World Federation of Trade Unions, Women's International Democratic Federation, and the World Peace Council). Communist front was a label frequently applied to political organizations opposed by anti-communists during the Cold War.

The strategy of creating or taking over organizations that would then claim to be expressions of popular will, and not manipulation by the Soviet Union or communist movement, was first suggested by Vladimir Lenin. These would not be political coalitions seeking power in opposition to fascist movements, but groups designed to spread the Marxist-Leninist message in places where the Communist party was either illegal or distrusted by many of the people the party wanted to reach.  It was used from the 1920s through the 1950s, and accelerated during the popular front period of the 1930s. Eventually there were large numbers of front organizations.

Comintern policy: 1934–1939

The international communism, in the form of the Communist International (Comintern), the international communist organization created by the Russian Communist Party in the wake of the 1917 Bolshevik Revolution, went through a number of ideological strategies to advance proletarian revolution. Its 1922 congress called for a "United Front" (the “Second Period”) after it became clear proletarian revolution would not sweep aside capitalism in the rest of the world, whereby the minority of workers who supported communist revolution would join forces against the bourgeoisie with workers outside the communist parties. This was followed by the "Third Period"  starting in mid-1928, which posited that capitalism was collapsing and militant policies should by rigidly maintained, As the Nazi Party came to power in 1933 in Germany, and annihilated one of the more successful communist movements in that country, it became clear fascism was both on the rise and saw Communism as an enemy to be destroyed, and that opposition to fascism was disorganized and divided. A new, less extreme policy was called for whereby Communists would form political coalitions with non-Communist socialists and even democratic non-socialists – "liberals, moderates, and even conservatives" – in "popular fronts" against fascism.

Germany
Until early 1933, the Communist Party of Germany (KPD) was regarded as the world's most successful communist party in terms of membership and electoral results. As a result, the Communist International, or Comintern, expected national communist parties to base their political style on the German example. That approach, known as the "class against class" strategy, or the ultra-left "Third Period", expected that the economic crisis and the trauma of war would increasingly radicalise public opinion and that if the communists remained aloof from mainstream democratic politics, they would benefit from the populist mood and be swept to power. As such, non-communist socialist parties were denounced as "social fascist".

After a series of financial crises in 1926, 1929 and 1931, public opinion in Europe was certainly radicalising but not to the benefit of left-wing anticapitalist parties. In the weeks that followed Hitler's rise to power in February 1933, the German Communist Party and the Comintern clung rigidly to their view that the Nazi triumph would be brief and that it would be a case of "after Hitler our turn". However, as the brutality of the Nazi government became clear and there was no sign of its collapse, communists began to sense that there was a need for a radical alteration of their stance, especially as Adolf Hitler had made it clear that he regarded the Soviet Union as an enemy state.

In several countries over the previous years, a sense had grown within elements of the Communist Parties that the German model of "class against class" was not the most appropriate way to succeed in their national political contexts and that it was necessary to build some alliance to prevent the greater threat of autocratic nationalist governments. However, figures such as Henri Barbé and Pierre Célor in France and José Bullejos and Adama in Spain, who advocated greater flexibility by co-operating loyally with social-democratic parties and possibly even left-wing capitalist parties, were removed from positions of power. Predecessors to the Popular Front had existed, such as in the (later-renamed) World Committee Against War and Imperialism, but they sought not to co-operate with other parties as equals but instead to draw potential sympathisers into the orbit of the communist movement, which caused them to be denounced by the leaders of other left-wing associations.

It was thus not until 1934 when Georgi Dimitrov, who had humiliated the Nazis with his defence against charges of involvement in the Reichstag Fire became the general secretary of the Comintern, and its officials became more receptive to the approach. Official acceptance of the new policy was first signalled in a Pravda article of May 1934, which commented favourably on socialist-communist collaboration. The reorientation was formalised at the Comintern's Seventh Congress in July 1935 and reached its apotheosis with the proclamation of a new policy: "The People's Front Against Fascism and War". Communist parties were now instructed to form broad alliances with all antifascist parties with the aim of securing social advance at home as well as a military alliance with the Soviet Union to isolate the fascist dictatorships. The "popular fronts" thus formed proved to be successful politically in forming governments in France, Spain and China but not elsewhere.

France 

In France, the collapse of a leftist government coalition of social-democrats and left-liberal republicans, followed by the far-right riots, which brought to power an autocratic right-wing government, changed the equation. To resist a slippery slope of encroachment towards authoritarianism, socialists were now more inclined to operate in the street and communists to co-operate with other antifascists in Parliament. In June 1934, Léon Blum's socialist French Section of the Workers' International (SFIO) signed a pact of united action with the French Communist Party. By October, the Communist Party had begun to suggest that the republican parties that had not sided with the nationalist government might also be included, and it accepted the offer the next July after the French government tilted even further to the right.

In May 1935, France and the Soviet Union signed a defensive alliance, and in August 1935, the 7th World Congress of the Comintern officially endorsed the Popular Front strategy. In the elections of May 1936, the Popular Front won a majority of parliamentary seats (378 deputies against 220), and Blum formed a government. In Fascist Italy, the Comintern advised an alliance between the Italian Communist Party and the Italian Socialist Party, but the latter rejected the idea.

Great Britain

There were attempts in Great Britain to found a popular front, against the National Government's appeasement of Nazi Germany, between the Labour Party, the Liberal Party, the Independent Labour Party, the Communist Party and even rebellious elements of the Conservative Party under Winston Churchill, but they failed mainly because of opposition from within the Labour Party, which was seething with anger over communist efforts to take over union locals. In addition, the incompatibility of liberal and socialist approaches also caused many Liberals to be hostile.

United States
The Communist Party of the United States of America (CPUSA) had been quite hostile to the New Deal until 1935, but it suddenly reversed positions and tried to form a popular front with the New Dealers. It sought a joint Socialist-Communist ticket with Norman Thomas's Socialist Party of America in the 1936 presidential election, but the Socialists rejected the overture. The communists also then offered support to Franklin Roosevelt's New Deal. The Popular Front saw the Communist Party taking a very patriotic and populist line, later called Browderism.

The Popular Front has been summarized by historian Kermit McKenzie as:

McKenzie asserted that to be a mere tactical expedient, with the broad goals of communists for the overthrow of capitalism through revolution remaining unchanged.

Cultural historian Michael Denning has challenged the Communist Party-centric view of the US popular front, saying that the "fellow travelers" in the US actually composed the majority of the movement. In his view, Communist party membership was only one (optional) element of leftist US culture at the time.

End of popular fronts

The period suddenly came to an end with another abrupt reversal of Soviet or communist policy, where  the Soviet Union signed the Molotov–Ribbentrop Pact with Nazi Germany in August 1939, dividing Central and Eastern Europe into German and Soviet spheres of influence, and leading to the Soviet takeover of the Baltic Republics and Finland. Comintern parties then turned from a policy of antifascism to one of advocating peace with Germany, maintaining that World War II (until Germany invaded the Soviet Union and the Communist party line reversed yet again) was not a fight against Nazi aggression, but "the Second Imperialist War". Many party members quit the party in disgust at the agreement between Hitler and Stalin, but many communists in France and other countries refused to enlist in their countries' forces until June 1941 since until then, Stalin was not at war with Hitler.

Critics and defenders of policy
Leon Trotsky and his far-left supporters roundly criticised the strategy. Trotsky believed that only united fronts could ultimately be progressive and that popular fronts were useless because they included bourgeois forces such as liberals. Trotsky also argued that in popular fronts, working-class demands are reduced to their bare minimum, and the ability of the working class to put forward its own independent set of politics is compromised. That view is now common to most Trotskyist groups. Left communist groups also oppose popular fronts, but they came to oppose united fronts as well.

In a book written in 1977, the eurocommunist leader Santiago Carrillo offered a positive assessment of the Popular Front. He argued that in Spain, despite the excesses attributable to the passions of civil war, the period of coalition government in Republican areas "contained in embryo the conception of an advance to socialism with democracy, with a multi-party system, parliament, and liberty for the opposition". Carrillo, however criticised the Communist International for not taking the Popular Front strategy far enough, especially since French communists were restricted to supporting Blum's government from without, rather than becoming full coalition partners.

Soviet bloc
After World War II, most Central and Eastern European countries were ruled by coalitions between several different political parties that voluntarily chose to work together. By the time that the countries in what became the Eastern Bloc had developed into Marxist–Leninist states, the non-communist parties had pushed out their more radical members and was now ruled by fellow travellers. As a result, the front had turned communist.

For example, East Germany was ruled by a "National Front" of all parties and movements within Parliament (Socialist Unity Party of Germany, Liberal Party, Farmers' Party, Youth Movement, Trade Union Federation etc.). At legislative elections, voters were presented with a single list of candidates from all parties.

The People's Republic of China's United Front is perhaps the best known example of a communist-run popular front in modern times. It is nominally a coalition of the Chinese Communist Party and eight minor parties. Though all parties had origins in independent parties prior to the Chinese Civil War, noncommunists eventually splintered out to join the Nationalists, and the parties remaining in Mainland China allied with either Communist Party sympathizers or, in some cases, actual members.

Soviet republics
In the republics of the Soviet Union, between around 1988 and 1992 (when the USSR had dissolved, and the republics were all independent), the term "Popular Front" had quite a different meaning. It referred to movements led by members of the liberal-minded intelligentsia (usually themselves members of the local Communist Party), in some republics small and peripheral but in others broad-based and influential. Officially, their aim was to defend perestroika against reactionary elements within the state bureaucracy, but over time, they began to question the legitimacy of their republics' membership of the Soviet Union. It was their initially cautious tone that gave them considerable freedom to organise and to gain access to the mass media. In the Baltic republics, they soon became the dominant political force and gradually gained the initiative from the more radical dissident organisations established earlier by moving their republics towards greater autonomy and then independence. They also became the main challengers to the communist parties' hegemony in Belarus, Moldova, Ukraine, Armenia and Azerbaijan. A Popular Front was established in Georgia but remained marginal, compared to the dominant dissident-led groups, since the April 9 tragedy had radicalised society and so it was unable to play the compromise role of similar movements. In the other republics, such organisations existed but never posed a meaningful threat to the incumbent party and economic elites.

List of popular fronts

Popular fronts in non-communist countries 
The French Front populaire and the Spanish Frente Popular popular fronts of the 1930s are the most notable ones.

 Popular Front (UK), an unofficial electoral alliance from 1936 to 1939 between the Communist Party of Great Britain, supporters of the Labour Party, the Liberal Party and the Independent Labour Party and anti-appeasers in the Conservative Party.
 Front populaire, left-wing anti-fascist coalition in France in the 1930s, was led by Léon Blum's French Section of the Workers' International but also included communists and social democrats.
 Frente popular, an electoral coalition formed in Spain in 1936 before the Spanish Civil War, which led by the Republican Left but also included communists, socialists and regional nationalists.
 Popular Front (Chile) Frente popular, an electoral and political left-wing coalition in Chile from 1937 to February 1941.
 Popular Democratic Front (Italy) Fronte Democratico Popolare, a coalition of communists and socialists for the 1948 Italian parliamentary election.
 Palestine Liberation Organization, formed in 1964 as a confederation of Palestinian nationalist groups opposed to Israel's existence and led by Fatah.
 Popular Front for the Liberation of the Occupied Arabian Gulf, an organisation formed in 1968 that brought together Arab nationalists and Marxist revolutionaries, split into Oman and Bahrain factions.
 Unidad Popular, a coalition of left wing, socialist and communist political parties in Chile that stood behind the successful candidacy of Salvador Allende for the 1970 Chilean presidential election.
 National Progressive Front (Syria), a political alliance formed in 1972 that unites parties supporting the ruling Syrian government, led by the Arab Socialist Ba'ath Party.
 National Progressive Front (Iraq), a political alliance formed in 1974 that united pro-government parties led by the Arab Socialist Ba'ath Party.
 Ivorian Popular Front Front Populaire Ivoirien, founded in exile in 1982 by history professor Laurent Gbagbo during the one-party rule of President Félix Houphouët-Boigny.
 Tripartite Alliance, a political alliance formed between the African National Congress, South African Communist Party and the Congress of South African Trade Unions in 1985.
 Popular Front (Burkina Faso), a political alliance that was formed in 1987 by President Blaise Compaoré and organised pro-government leftist parties.
 Democratic Front for the Reunification of Korea, led by the Workers' Party of Korea (originated from the United Democratic National Front of 1946 to 1949), was originally founded in 1948 when North Korea was a Marxist–Leninist state. Since 1992, all Marxist references were deprecated in favor of Juche.
 United Progressive Alliance, a coalition of leftist and centre-left parties in India formed in 2004 and led by the Indian National Congress.
 Broad Front (Uruguay), a coalition of centre-left and left-wing parties that started to rule Uruguay in 2005.
 Broad Front (Peru), a coalition of left-wing parties founded in 2013.
 Grand Alliance (Bangladesh), a leftist political alliance that includes the left-wing Awami League, the socialist Jatiya Samajtantrik Dal and the communist Workers Party.
 With the Strength of the People, an electoral coalition formed by Brazil's Worker's Party and including social democrats, communists, socialists and other groups.
 Popular Front (Tunisia) Front populaire pour la réalisation des objectifs de la révolution, formed in Tunis in October 2012 as part of the Arab Spring.
 Great Patriotic Pole, an electoral coalition formed in 2012 to unite various left-wing parties in support of Hugo Chávez and led by the United Socialist Party of Venezuela.
Kansanrintamahallitus (Popular Bloc Coalition) is and was a coalition in Finnish parliamentary politics, mainly made up of the Agrarian Centre Party, Social Democrats and the communist Finnish People's Democratic League.

Popular fronts in post-Soviet countries
These are non-socialist parties unless indicated otherwise:

 The following were part of glasnost and perestroika during the 1980s:

These were established after the collapse of the Soviet Union in 1991:

 All-Russia People's Front Общероссийский народный фронт, created in 2011 by Prime Minister Vladimir Putin to provide United Russia with "new ideas, new suggestions and new faces" and intended to be a coalition between the ruling party and numerous non-United Russia nongovernmental organizations.

List of national fronts

In current communist countries
 People's Republic of China, the United Front led by the Chinese Communist Party
 Socialist Republic of Vietnam, the Vietnamese Fatherland Front led by the Communist Party of Vietnam (succeeded the North Vietnamese Fatherland Front of 1955 to 1977)
Republic of Cuba, Committees for the Defense of the Revolution, led by the Communist Party of Cuba
 Lao People's Democratic Republic, the Lao Front for National Construction, led by the Lao People's Revolutionary Party

In former communist countries 
 People's Socialist Republic of Albania the Democratic Front, led by the Albanian Party of Labour, which succeeded the National Liberation Front of 1942 to 1945
 Democratic Republic of Afghanistan the National Front, led by the People's Democratic Party of Afghanistan
 People's Republic of Bulgaria the Fatherland Front, led by the Bulgarian Communist Party
 People's Republic of the Congo the Défense Civile and then the United Democratic Forces, led by the Congolese Party of Labour
 Czechoslovak Socialist Republic the National Front, led by the Communist Party of Czechoslovakia
 Democratic People's Republic of Korea - the Democratic Front for the Reunification of the Fatherland, led by the Workers' Party of Korea (succeeded the United Democratic National Front of 1946 to 1949).
 German Democratic Republic the Democratic Bloc and then the National Front, led by the Socialist Unity Party of Germany
 People's Revolutionary Government (Grenada) the People's Alliance, led by the New Jewel Movement
 People's Republic of Hungary the  led by the Hungarian Communist Party, replaced in 1949 by the Hungarian Independence People's Front, led by the Hungarian Working People's Party, and replaced by the Patriotic People's Front in 1954, which, after 1956, was led by the Hungarian Socialist Workers' Party)
 Democratic Kampuchea the National United Front of Kampuchea, led by the Communist Party of Kampuchea and replaced by the Patriotic and Democratic Front of the Great National Union of Kampuchea.
 People's Republic of Poland the Democratic Bloc led by the Polish United Workers' Party, replaced by the Front of National Unity in 1952 and then by the Patriotic Movement for National Rebirth in 1983
 People's Democratic Republic of Yemen the National Liberation Front and National Democratic Front, led by the Yemeni Socialist Party
 Socialist Republic of Romania the National Democratic Front, renamed People's Democratic Front led by the Romanian Communist Party and replaced in 1968 by the Socialist Unity Front, later renamed the Socialist Democracy and Unity Front
 SFR Yugoslavia the National Front of Yugoslavia, led by the Communist Party of Yugoslavia and replaced by the Socialist Alliance of Working People of Yugoslavia in 1945

See also 

 National Front
 Third Period
 United front

Notes

References 
 Citations

Further reading
 Graham,  Helen, and Paul Preston, eds. The Popular Front in Europe (1989).
 Haslam, Jonathan. "The Comintern and the Origins of the Popular Front 1934–1935." Historical Journal 22#3 (1979): 673–691.
 Horn, Gerd-Rainer. European Socialists Respond to Fascism: Ideology, Activism and Contingency in the 1930s. (Oxford University Press, 1997).
 Mates, Lewis.  "The United Front and the Popular Front in the North-east of England, 1936-1939." PhD dissertation, 2002.
 Priestland, David. The Red Flag: A History of Communism (2010) pp 182–233.
 Vials, Christopher. Haunted by Hitler: Liberals, the Left, and the Fight against Fascism in the United States. (U of Massachusetts Press, 2014).

Comintern
Communist terminology
Political terminology
History of socialism